The black-and-gold tanager (Bangsia melanochlamys) is a species of bird in the family Thraupidae.
It is endemic to Colombia.

Its natural habitat is subtropical or tropical moist montane forests.
It is threatened by habitat loss.

References

Birds of Colombia
Endemic birds of Colombia
Bangsia
Birds described in 1910
Taxonomy articles created by Polbot